Events in the year 2006 in Brazil.

Incumbents

Federal government
 President: Luiz Inácio Lula da Silva 
 Vice President: José Alencar Gomes da Silva

Governors
 Acre: Jorge Viana 
 Alagoas: Ronaldo Lessa (till 31 March); Luís Abílio de Sousa Neto (from 31 March)
 Amapa: Waldez Góes
 Amazonas: Eduardo Braga
 Bahia: Paulo Souto
 Ceará: Lúcio Alcântara
 Espírito Santo: Paulo Hartung
 Goiás: Marconi Perillo (till 31 March); Alcides Rodrigues (from 31 March)
 Maranhão: José Reinaldo Tavares
 Mato Grosso: Blairo Maggi
 Mato Grosso do Sul: José Orcírio Miranda dos Santos
 Minas Gerais: Aécio Neves
 Pará: Simão Jatene
 Paraíba: Cássio Cunha Lima
 Paraná: Hermas Eurides Brandão
 Pernambuco: Jarbas Vasconcelos (till 31 March); Mendonça Filho (from 31 March)
 Piauí: Wellington Dias
 Rio de Janeiro: Rosinha Garotinho
 Rio Grande do Norte: Wilma Maria de Faria
 Rio Grande do Sul: Germano Rigotto
 Rondônia: Ivo Narciso Cassol
 Roraima: Ottomar de Sousa Pinto
 Santa Catarina: Luiz Henrique da Silveira (till 9 April); Eduardo Moreira (from 9 April)
 São Paulo: Geraldo Alckmin (till 31 March); Cláudio Lembo (from 31 March)
 Sergipe: João Filho
 Tocantins: Marcelo Miranda

Vice governors
 Acre: Arnóbio Marques de Almeida Júnior 
 Alagoas: Luís Abílio de Sousa Neto (till 31 March); vacant thereafter
 Amapá: Pedro Paulo Dias de Carvalho 
 Amazonas: Omar José Abdel Aziz 
 Bahia: Eraldo Tinoco Melo 
 Ceará: Francisco de Queiroz Maia Júnior 
 Espírito Santo: Wellington Coimbra 
 Goiás: Alcides Rodrigues Filho 
 Maranhão: Jurandir Ferro do Lago Filho 
 Mato Grosso: Iraci Araújo Moreira 
 Mato Grosso do Sul: Egon Krakheche 
 Minas Gerais: Clésio Soares de Andrade 
 Pará: Valéria Pires Franco 
 Paraíba: Lauremília Lucena 
 Paraná: Orlando Pessuti 
 Pernambuco: José Mendonça Bezerra Filho 
 Piauí: Osmar Ribeiro de Almeida Júnior 
 Rio de Janeiro: Luiz Paulo Conde
 Rio Grande do Norte: Antônio Jácome 
 Rio Grande do Sul: Antônio Carlos Hohlfeldt 
 Rondônia: Odaísa Fernandes Ferreira 
 Roraima: Erci de Moraes 
 Santa Catarina: Eduardo Pinho Moreira (till 9 April); vacant (from 9 April)
 São Paulo: Claudio Lembo (till 31 March), vacant (from 31 March)
 Sergipe: Marília Mandarino 
 Tocantins: Raimundo Nonato Pires dos Santos

Events
 March 30 – Marcos Pontes becomes the first Brazilian and the first lusophone to go into space, where he stayed on the International Space Station for a week. During his trip, Pontes carried out eight experiments selected by the Brazilian Space Agency. He landed in Kazakhstan on April 8, 2006, with the crew of Expedition 12.
 May 12 – May 2006 São Paulo violence 
 July 12 – July 2006 São Paulo violence
 August 7 – Lei Maria da Penha is sanctioned by president Luiz Inácio Lula da Silva. 
 September 29 – Gol Transportes Aéreos Flight 1907 leads to the 2006–07 Brazilian aviation crisis.

Elections
 Brazilian general election, 2006
 Rio Grande do Sul gubernatorial election, 2006
 São Paulo gubernatorial election, 2006

Founded
 Black House MMA Team.
 Museum of the Portuguese Language
 International Meal Company
 PlayTV

Football Clubs
 The following 14 clubs were founded in 2006: Adap Galo Maringá Football Club, Arsenal Atividades Desportivas Sport Club, Associação Atlética Carapebus, Coimbra Esporte Clube, Cuiabá Arsenal, Ivinhema Futebol Clube, Sociedade Desportiva Juazeirense, Juventus Futebol Clube, Legião Futebol Clube, Olé Brasil Futebol Clube, Primavera Esporte Clube, Rondonópolis Esporte Clube, Associação Esportiva Real, and Sampaio Corrêa Futebol e Esporte

Film
 List of Brazilian films of 2006

Television

Debuted

 Cobras & Lagartos
 Floribella
 Ídolos
 O Profeta
 Páginas da Vida
 Pé na Jaca
 Topa ou Não Topa
 Vidas Opostas

Ended
 Alma Gêmea
 Belíssima
 Cobras & Lagartos
 Pé na Jaca

Music
Yahoo reunite.
 The bands Os Mutantes, Orkestra Rumpilezz, Thyresis, Almah and Rivotrill are formed.

Sport

 2006 in Brazilian football. 
 2006 Grand Prix de Futsal.
 2006 CONMEBOL Beach Soccer Championship.
 2006 FIFA Beach Soccer World Cup. 
 2006 Brazilian Grand Prix.
 2006 Desafio Internacional das Estrelas. 
 2006 Brasil Open. 
 2006 Copa América de Ciclismo. 
 Brazil win the 2006 South American Rugby Championship "B". 
 Brazil participate in the 2006 FIBA World Championship for Women.
 2006 FINA Youth World Swimming Championships in Rio de Janeiro. 
 2006 Pan American Men's Youth Handball Championship.
 2006 Beach Handball World Championships. 
 Brazil at the 2006 Winter Olympics.
 Brazil at the 2006 Lusophony Games.

Deaths 
 June 17 – Bussunda, comedian (b. 1962)
 November 15 – Ana Carolina Reston, fashion model (b. 1985)

See also 
2006 in Brazilian football

References

 
2000s in Brazil
Years of the 21st century in Brazil
Brazil
Brazil